The Copa Preparación 1962 was the 5th edition of the Chilean Cup tournament. The competition started on April 15, 1962, and concluded on May 20, 1962. Luis Cruz Martínez won the competition for the first time, beating Universidad Católica 2–1 in the final.

Matches were scheduled to be played at the stadium of the team named first on the date specified for each round. If scores were level after 90 minutes had been played, an extra time took place. If scores were still level after the 30 minutes extra time, a penalty shootout took place, where every team designated one kicker, who takes 3 penalty kicks. If at the end of these three rounds of kicks the teams have scored an equal number of goals, a coin toss took place.

Calendar

First round

* Qualified as "Best Loser"

Second round

Third round

Semifinals

Final

Top goalscorer
 Hernán Zamora (U. Católica) 5 goals

See also
 1962 Campeonato Nacional
 Primera B

References
Revista Estadio (Santiago, Chile) April, May 1962 (revised scores & information)
RSSSF (secondary source)

Copa Chile
Chil
1962
Football competitions in Chile